Zhengxing is a town in Jinggu Dai and Yi Autonomous County, Yunnan, China.

Administrative division
As of 2016, the town is divided into eleven villages: 
 Jingnan
 Boyun
 Xinzhai
 Shuiping
 Menglie
 Tiechang
 Zhengxing
 Tongda
 Mengnai
 Weng'an
 Huangcaoba

Geography
The town is situated at eastern Jinggu Dai and Yi Autonomous County. The town is bordered to the north by Weiyuan Town and Fengshan, to the east and south by Ning'er Hani and Yi Autonomous County, and to the west by Yizhi Township.

The Xiaohei River flows through the town.

Economy
The local economy is primarily based upon agriculture. Commercial crops include tobacco, natural rubber, and vegetable. The region also has an abundance of limestone, copper, lead, and zinc.

Demographics

As of 2020, the National Bureau of Statistics of China estimates the town's population now to be 20,476.

Tourist attractions
The Mengnai Immortal Cave is a famous scenic spot in the town, famous for its karst cave.

Transportation
The China National Highway 323 passes across western Zhengxing.

References

Bibliography

Divisions of Jinggu Dai and Yi Autonomous County